Alyssa Murray (born March 17, 1992) is a professional American lacrosse player playing for the Philadelphia Force (UWLX). She played college lacrosse for the Syracuse Orange women's lacrosse.

Career
Murray had a stand out high school career at West Babylon High School in West Babylon, New York, where she set the standing NYSPHSAA all-time record for career assists, registering 278 between 2008-10. Combined with 284 goals, Alyssa finished her scholastic career with 562 career points, along the way becoming a four-time All-Suffolk County honoree and a 2009 US Lacrosse High School All-American.

At Syracuse, she was second on school's all-time scoring list (362 pts), third in career goals (225) and assists (136), and fourth in single season points (2014 - 110 pts). She was teammates with  Kayla Treanor and Halle Majorana.

Murray was selected 7th overall in the inaugural United Women's Lacrosse League draft in 2016 by the Philadelphia Force (UWLX).

Awards and honors
2016 UWLX All-Star Selection

Media coverage
Featured in the October 2016 issue of SELF Magazine

References

1992 births
American lacrosse players
Living people
People from West Babylon, New York
Sportspeople from New York (state)
Syracuse Orange women's lacrosse players
Women's lacrosse players
Competitors at the 2017 World Games
World Games gold medalists